Vishukkani is a 1977 Indian Malayalam-language film, directed by J. Sasikumar and produced by R. M. Sundaram. The film stars Prem Nazir, Sharada, Thikkurissy Sukumaran Nair and Sankaradi. It is a remake of the Tamil film Karpagam.

Plot

Cast 

Prem Nazir as Gopi
Sharada as Rajani
Vidhubala as Radhika
Thikkurissy Sukumaran Nair as Rajendra Panikkar
Adoor Bhasi as Kurup
Sankaradi as Prabhakaran Pillai
M. G. Soman as Radhakrishnan
Sreelatha Namboothiri as Jaya
Veeran as Collector Janardhanan Nair
Reena as Geetha
Kaduvakulam Antony
 Master Kumar as Ambili

Soundtrack 
The music was composed by Salil Chowdhury and the lyrics were written by Sreekumaran Thampi.

References

External links 
 

1970s Malayalam-language films
1977 films
Films directed by J. Sasikumar
Films scored by Salil Chowdhury
Malayalam remakes of Tamil films